Union County Courthouse is a historic courthouse located at Liberty, Union County, Indiana.  It was designed by noted Indianapolis architect George W. Bunting and built in 1890–1891.  It is a two-story, rectangular, Richardsonian Romanesque style rock faced ashlar stone building on a raised basement.  It has a hipped roof and features an arched entrance and four-story clock tower.

It was listed on the National Register of Historic Places in 1987. It is located in the Liberty Courthouse Square Historic District.

References

County courthouses in Indiana
Clock towers in Indiana
Courthouses on the National Register of Historic Places in Indiana
Richardsonian Romanesque architecture in Indiana
Government buildings completed in 1891
Buildings and structures in Union County, Indiana
National Register of Historic Places in Union County, Indiana
Historic district contributing properties in Indiana